Sviatlana Sakhanenka (born 26 October 1989) is a Belarusian visually impaired cross-country skier and biathlete. She made her Paralympic debut during the 2018 Winter Paralympics and she competed in the biathlon and cross-country skiing events.

Sviatlana Sakhanenka clinched her maiden gold medal in her Paralympic career after clinching the medal in the 15km free visually impaired cross-country event during the 2018 Winter Paralympics. and followed it up with another gold medal in the Cross-country skiing by claiming a gold medal in the women's 1.5km sprint classical cross-country skiing event. She also claimed a bronze medal in the women's 6km visually impaired biathlon event at the 2018 Winter Paralympics.

She won the gold medal in the women's 10km visually impaired cross-country skiing event at the 2021 World Para Snow Sports Championships held in Lillehammer, Norway. She also won the gold medal in the women's long-distance visually impaired cross-country skiing event.

References

External links 
 

1989 births
Living people
Belarusian female biathletes
Biathletes at the 2018 Winter Paralympics
Paralympic biathletes of Belarus
Medalists at the 2018 Winter Paralympics
Paralympic gold medalists for Belarus
Paralympic bronze medalists for Belarus
Cross-country skiers at the 2018 Winter Paralympics
Paralympic cross-country skiers of Belarus
Visually impaired category Paralympic competitors
Paralympic medalists in cross-country skiing
Paralympic medalists in biathlon
21st-century Belarusian women
Belarusian people with disabilities
Blind people